Badarpur Assembly constituency is one of the 126 constituencies of the Legislative Assembly of Assam state in northeastern India.

Badarpur (constituency number 5) is one of the 5 constituencies located in Barak Valley of Karimganj district. Badarpur is part of the Karimganj Lok Sabha constituency along with 7 other assembly segments, namely Patharkandi, Karimganj North, Karimganj South, Ratabari in Karimganj district, Hailakandi, Katlichera and Algapur in Hailakandi district.

Members of Legislative Assembly 
 1951: Moulana Abdul Jalil Choudhury, Indian National Congress.
 1957: Moulana Abdul Jalil Choudhury, Indian National Congress.
 1958: Bimala Prasad Chaliha, Indian National Congress.
 1962: Moulana Abdul Jalil Choudhury, Indian National Congress.
 1967: Moulana Abdul Jalil Choudhury, Indian National Congress.
 1972: Moulana Abdul Jalil Choudhury, Indian National Congress.
 1978: Ramendra De, Communist Party of India (Marxist).
 1983: Gulam Subhany Choudhury, Indian National Congress.
 1985: Ramendra De, Communist Party of India (Marxist).
 1991: Abu Saleh Najmuddin, Indian National Congress.
 1996: Abu Saleh Najmuddin, Indian National Congress.
 2001: JamalUddin Ahmed, All India Trinamool Congress.
 2006: Anwarul Hoque, All India United Democratic Front.
 2011: JamalUddin Ahmed, Indian National Congress.
 2016: JamalUddin Ahmed, Indian National Congress.
 2021: Abdul Aziz, All India United Democratic Front.

Election results

2016 result

2011 result

2006 result

2001 result

References

External links 
 

Assembly constituencies of Assam
Karimganj district